Saadi Al Munla (4 November 1890 – 12 December 1975) was a Lebanese politician and one of the former Lebanese prime ministers. He also served as minister of economy.

Early life and education
Munla was a member of a Sunni family based in Tripoli. He was born there on 4 November 1890. He received a law degree.

Career and activities
Munla was a lawyer by profession. He was a protégé of Rashid Karami and a member of the Independence Party headed by Abdul Hamid Karami. He then became a member of the Lebanese parliament. In 1945 he was appointed minister to the cabinet led by Prime Minister Sami Solh. Munla and two other cabinet members who were also the member of the Independence Party, Ahmed Asad and Jamil Talhouk, resigned from office in May 1946. 
Munla was appointed prime minister on 22 May 1946 under President Bishara Khoury replacing Sami Solh in the post. Munla was in the office until 14 December 1946, and Riad Solh succeeded him as prime minister. During his premiership Munla also assumed the position of economy minister. He died in December 1975.

References

External links

20th-century Lebanese lawyers
1890 births
1975 deaths
Government ministers of Lebanon
Independent politicians in Lebanon
Lebanese Muslims
Members of the Parliament of Lebanon
People from Tripoli, Lebanon
Prime Ministers of Lebanon